This is a list of Members of the Parliament of Australia who have represented more than one state or territory during their federal parliamentary career.

Most people in the list represented different states or territories in the House of Representatives.  Nobody has ever represented different states or territories in the Senate, although various attempts have been made. Only one person, Barnaby Joyce, has ever represented one state in the Senate and a different state in the House of Representatives.

The first person to represent a second state was Billy Hughes.  He had represented New South Wales since 1901, and was elected to a Victorian seat on 5 May 1917.  On 16 December 1922 he was again elected to a NSW seat, the only person to return to his original state.  Hughes is also the only person in this list whose parliamentary service was continuous.

The only person who represented both a state and a territory was Lewis Nott (Queensland 1925-28; Australian Capital Territory 1949-51).

All states and territories except South Australia and the Northern Territory are represented in the list.

Sources
  Members of the House of Representatives since 1901

 
 
Lists of legislators in Australia
Australia